Gord Miller (born March 27, 1953) is a Canadian politician who was the Environmental Commissioner of Ontario, having served from February 1, 2000 to May 18, 2015.  He was appointed to a five-year term in 2000 and was reappointed to this position in 2005 and 2010 for two consecutive five-year terms.

Early life
Before his appointment, he worked for the Ontario Ministry of the Environment for 14 years as a scientist, manager of training and development, and as a district manager. He also helped to set up the advocacy organization Ontario Public Interest Group Guelph. Miller received an Honours Bachelor of Science degree in Biology  in 1976 and a Master of Science degree in Plant ecology in 1978, both from the University of Guelph.

Tenure as environment commissioner

As environment commissioner, Miller issued strongly-worded reports annually, calling the province to account on its environmental commitments. Starting in 2008, he added special reports on greenhouse gas emissions and energy conservation.

Miller did not shy away from direct criticism of government decisions and longstanding abuses in law. An early example was his direct condemnation of SLAPP lawsuits for their negative effect on public advocacy. Miller's reports very strongly supported "environmental activists" who argued, "the practice is widespread in the development industry and used to pacify activists and environmentalists", that is, silence them with fear of civil liability. Ontario passed an anti-SLAPP law in 2010.

In 2013 Miller called to public attention the fact that Ontario’s cabinet had allocated to itself, in the 2012 budget, the power to turn over public land to the exclusive control of private, multinational corporations. In a formal report Miller said that this, combined with cuts to staff and programs at Ministries of Natural Resources and the Environment, all "quietly and without public consultation", led to a situation with "no rules". Other actions were, Miller said, "gutting" protections for species at risk and that it was time for hydraulic fracturing regulation.

In 2014 Miller warned that Ontario had done "very little" other than closing coal plants to meet its 2020 emissions targets, and had failed to build transit and other efficient infrastructure.

Appointment controversy
Miller's sharp turn on the Harris government ended a longstanding controversy.  Due to his two prior candidacies, Miller's initial appointment raised the perception by the NDP and Liberal caucuses that he was a Conservative partisan.  Opposition parties at Queen's Park accused the Harris government of using its majority to name a Conservative as Ontario's environment commissioner. Miller was subsequently re-appointed twice by two successive parliaments headed by Liberal governments, whom he sharply criticized.

Politics

Miller was, in addition to a former federal and provincial PC candidate, the president of the federal Conservative riding association in Nipissing, home riding of then-Premier Mike Harris.

On May 19, 2015, Miller sought the Green Party of Canada nomination for the seat of Guelph in the upcoming Canadian federal election, and on June 8, 2015, he was selected to run.  He had gone to university there in 1977-79 and helped found the Ontario Public Interest Research Group in Guelph.

Miller had also previously run for provincial Progressive Conservatives in 1995 and in 1997 for Jean Charest's federal Progressive Conservatives.  He said the 2015 Conservative Party of Canada "is not like and doesn't represent the points of view" of those parties: "We thought we were uniting the right, instead we united the wrong".

Miller was considered a star candidate by local media.  From his first public appearance he sharply criticized all the other parties for "committing to pursuing an economy based on bitumen from Alberta that we'll never be able to extract", echoing former Bank of Canada head Mark Carney's formal raising of this issue at the Financial Stability Board and Bank of England in 2014.  Miller also accused the government of "silencing" scientists and called Bill C-51 "a terrible piece of legislation."

Electoral record

Federal

Provincial

See also
Environmental Bill of Rights

References

External links
 Environmental Commissioner of Ontario
 Gord Miller's MP campaign page for Guelph

1953 births
20th-century Canadian civil servants
21st-century Canadian civil servants
Canadian biologists
Green Party of Canada candidates in the 2015 Canadian federal election
Green Party of Canada candidates in the 2019 Canadian federal election
Living people
University of Guelph alumni